Ivan Lajtman (born 1 July 1979 in Đakovo) is a Croatian retired footballer who last played for NK Rovinj.

Club career
Lajtman previously played for HNK Cibalia and NK Zagreb in the Croatian First League.

References

External links
 

1979 births
Living people
Sportspeople from Đakovo
Association football midfielders
Croatian footballers
HNK Cibalia players
NK Široki Brijeg players
NK Zagreb players
NK Istra 1961 players
NK Karlovac players
NK Rovinj players
Croatian Football League players
Premier League of Bosnia and Herzegovina players
Croatian expatriate footballers
Expatriate footballers in Bosnia and Herzegovina
Croatian expatriate sportspeople in Bosnia and Herzegovina